The Lordship of Winneburg and Beilstein (German: Herrschaft Winneburg und Beilstein) was a territory of the Holy Roman Empire made of non-contiguous parts located in the Moselle Valley around Winneburg Castle near Cochem, and Beilstein, on the Moselle River. It should not be confused with the County of Beilstein, or Nassau-Beilstein, which belonged to the House of Nassau.

History
The Lords of Winneburg were first mentioned in a 1304 deed, they also acquired the estates of the neighbouring Beilstein Castle in 1362. In the following decades the Lords of Winneburg and Beilstein were forced to give their lands in pawn to the Archbishops of Trier, who after a feud, finally seized the property in 1488, only  to lend it back as a fiefdom a few years later.

After the Winneburg-Beilstein line had become extinct, the descendants of the Trier archbishop Lothar von Metternich (1551–1623) from 1635 on called themselves Freiherren von Metternich-Winneburg zu Beilstein and were elevated to Imperial counts in 1679. The last reigning Count Franz George Karl, lost his territory to France when that country officially annexed the left bank of the Rhine following the 1801 Treaty of Lunéville. He was however compensated in the course of the German mediatization with the possession of secularized Ochsenhausen Abbey and with the title of Prince of the Holy Roman Empire in 1803.

According to the Final Act of the Congress of Vienna, Winneburg-Beilstein together with the Rhineland fell to Prussia in 1815. Franz George Karl's son, Prince Klemens Wenzel von Metternich took the chance to buy the ruin of Winneburg Castle in 1832 but never rebuilt it.

1480s establishments in the Holy Roman Empire
1488 establishments in Europe
1801 disestablishments in the Holy Roman Empire
States and territories established in 1488
Beilstein
Lower Rhenish-Westphalian Circle
Winneburg